Orthodoxy in Norway may refer to:

 Eastern Orthodoxy in Norway
 Oriental Orthodoxy in Norway